Luci mie traditrici (My Traitorous Eyes) is an opera in two acts by Salvatore Sciarrino, who also wrote the libretto. It was first performed under the German title Die tödliche Blume (The Deadly Flower) on 19 May 1998 in the Schlosstheater Schwetzingen at the Schwetzingen Festival. The title is taken from a line in the opera by the countess. The couple's name 'Malaspina' is of an Italian noble family, but it translates as 'evil thorn'. A performance lasts about 1 1/4 hours.

Composition history

Sciarrino started composing the opera in 1996. He based the libretto on the 1590 murder by the composer Carlo Gesualdo of his wife and her lover, but while working on it he discovered that Alfred Schnittke was also composing an opera (Gesualdo, 1993) on the same story. Deleting the references to Gesualdo, Sciarrino turned to a play, Il tradimento per l'onore, by Giacinto Andrea Cicognini, and also used an elegy of Claude Le Jeune, based on a text by Pierre de Ronsard. Sciarrino dedicated the opera to Marilisa Pollini, Maurizio Pollini's wife.

Roles

Synopsis

 Place: The home of the Count and Countess
 Time: Late sixteenth century

Act 1
In the prologue, a backstage voice sings Le Jeune's French elegy. It is morning, and the count and countess declare their eternal love. The servant announces the arrival of the guest. After a short intermezzo, it is now mid-day. The countess and the guest make love. As darkness descends, the guest leaves and the countess is alone with the servant.

Act 2
In the evening, the count forgives the countess. Later that night, the countess opens the curtains of her bed, discovering the dead body of the guest. The count stabs the countess and she collapses on the body of the guest.

Performance history

Following the Schwetzingen premiere, the opera has been performed at the Théâtre Royal de la Monnaie in Brussels and in New York with choreography by Trisha Brown (2001), as well as by the Ensemble Risognanze (2003) and at the Salzburg Festival (2008), the Berlin Festival of Contemporary Music (2010), a co-production between the Festival of Contemporary Art in Montepulciano (2010) and Oper Frankfurt (2011) as well as at the Berlin State Opera (2016).

Recordings

Notes

References

External links
 Work details, salvatoresciarrino.eu (in Italian)
 Libretto, salvatoresciarrino.eu (in Italian)

Operas
1998 operas
Italian-language operas
Operas set in the 16th century
Operas by Salvatore Sciarrino
Music dedicated to family or friends
Operas based on plays